The 1st Annual British Academy Television Craft Awards were presented by the British Academy of Film and Television Arts (BAFTA) on 30 April 2000, with Gabby Yorath presiding over the event. The awards were held at BAFTA headquarters at 195 Piccadilly, Westminster, London, and given in recognition of technical achievements in British television of 1999. Previously, craft awards were handed out in conjunction with the television awards which, from 1968 to 1999, was held as a joint event with the film awards.

Winners and nominees
Winners are listed first and highlighted in boldface; the nominees are listed below alphabetically and not in boldface.

See also
British Academy Television Awards 2000

References

External links
British Academy Craft Awards official website

British Academy Television Craft Awards
British Academy Television Craft Awards
British Academy Television Craft Awards
British Academy Television Craft Awards
British Academy Television Craft Awards
British Academy Television Craft Awards